Stock car racing events in the NASCAR Xfinity Series have been held at Martinsville Speedway, in Martinsville, Virginia during numerous seasons and times of year since the series’ inception in 1982. Races were first held from 1982 to 1994, and a one-off race occurred in July 2006. In October 2020, the series returned after a 14-year absence, adding a second date in 2021.

Spring race

The Call 811.com Before You Dig 250 is a NASCAR Xfinity Series stock car racing spring event at Martinsville Speedway, in Martinsville, Virginia, originally held from 1982 to 1994 as a standalone spring meeting, but starting in 2021 returns as part of a three-day tripleheader along with the NASCAR Whelen Modified Tour and NASCAR Cup Series.

It was first held as a Late Model Sportsman and Modified doubleheader in 1970, and in 1982 the Late Model Sportsman feature changed to a touring format for the original 1982 Budweiser Late Model Sportsman season, and stayed as a touring race until 1994. Following the 1994 season, both of Martinsville's race, the Miller 500 and the Advance Auto 500, were converted to Late Model only races.  The March Late Model race was discontinued at the end of the 1997 season.

In 2021, the Xfinity Series restored Martinsville's spring date as a night race in support of the Cup Series' Blue-Emu Maximum Pain Relief 500 and aligned with the Modified Tour where the two series race over consecutive nights, instead of racing on one day. The race is one of two Xfinity events at the short track along with the Draft Top 250 in the fall.

The race changed distances several times in its history. When first held in 1970, the Late Model Sportsman and Modified features were both 250 laps, covering .  Following the addition of local Late Models and the conversion of the Modified race into part of the NASCAR's regional touring series in 1985, the two touring races were decreased to 200 laps,  with a 100 lap,  Late Model feature, where it remained until the Modifieds were removed for the 1993 season, when the distance was increased to 300 laps,  for the touring Busch Grand National cars, and 200 laps,  for the Late Model race.  When the race format became strictly Late Model only, the qualifying races and Late Model feature (25 lap heat races and last chance race) totaled 300 laps.  The race was discontinued after the 1997 season, and only the fall race was held for Late Models.

The race was never 500 laps, miles, or kilometers in distance at any point in its history. The "500" originated from Martinsville's two traditional combination Late Model and/or Modified races that resulted in a 500-lap format:

  1970–84: 250 laps, co-featured with Modifieds
  1985–91: 200 laps, co-featured with the NASCAR Whelen Modified Tour, and 100 laps Late Model racing
  1992–94: 300 laps, and 200 laps Late Model racing

The 2021 Cup Weekend format returned to the 1970-84 format of 250 laps.  The Whelen Modified Tour returned as the Thursday night feature, with the Xfinity race the Friday night feature.  No practice or qualifying were held as part of post-pandemic restrictions, but they returned for the 2022 running.

2021: Race suspended from Friday night to Sunday afternoon due to rain.
2022: Race extended due to NASCAR overtime.

Multiple winners (drivers)

Multiple winners (teams)

Manufacturer wins

Summer race

The Goody's 250 was the name given for the second-tier series' one-off return to the track in 2006, after an absence since 1994, held during the summer of that year. It had been speculated the race would be held at night, under a temporary lighting system to be installed at the track, but it was held in the afternoon instead. The event replaced the ITT Industries & Goulds Pumps Salute to the Troops 250 at Pikes Peak International Raceway on the Busch Series schedule. The race was replaced in 2007 by the NAPA Auto Parts 200 at the Circuit Gilles Villeneuve road course in Montreal, Quebec, Canada. The race was the final start in NASCAR for Darrell Waltrip and Ricky Craven.

September race

The Zerex 150 was a NASCAR Busch Series stock car race held at Martinsville Speedway, in Martinsville, Virginia. It was first held during the inaugural season for the Busch Series in 1982, as well as 1983. It was removed from the schedule in 1984, but returned in 1986. It was removed permanently following the 1990 season. It was a third Busch Series race at Martinsville in the seasons it was held, scheduled after the Miller 500 held early in the season, and about one month prior to the Advance Auto 500, the final race of the season. With a distance of 150 laps, it was the shortest of Martinsville's three Busch races.

Fall race

The Dead On Tools 250 is a NASCAR Xfinity Series stock car race held at Martinsville Speedway in Martinsville, Virginia. Originally a Late Model race when it began in 1970, it joined the Budweiser Late Model Sportsman touring series in 1982 (the original year), and remained a part of the series through 1994. Following the 1994 season, both of Martinsville's races, the Miller 500 and the Advance Auto 500, were switched to a late model-only race with the ValleyStar Credit Union 300. The Advance Auto 500 served as the final race of the season for the series for ten years, from 1982 through 1991. The series returned to Martinsville for one year for one race in 2006, where it was known as the Goody's 250, before being removed from the schedule again in 2007. The track was given a date on the Xfinity Series schedule again starting in 2020.

History
The race changed distances several times in its history. From its inception until 1984, the twin feature races was 250 laps for each division, covering .  When both the Modified and Late Model Sportsman cars had both become touring format races, the local Late Model feature reduced the Modified and Busch features in 1985 to 200 laps, .  After Modifieds were dropped in 1993 in light of early 1990s safety issues, the distance was increased to 300 laps, while the Late Model race increased to 200 laps, when it changed in 1994 to 300 laps. When the 1st revival occurred the race was changed to 250 laps & now for the 2nd revival it will go remain to 250 laps.

As was the tradition at Martinsville, the two non-Cup race weekends featured two or three races that totaled 500 laps, a tradition still in place today by the now-Late Model only race, with qualifying races totaling 100 laps and a 200-lap feature.

The Xfinity Series returned to Martinsville in 2020 for a night race at the track in the fall as part of a triple-header with the NASCAR Truck Series and NASCAR Cup Series. It was the second-to-last race of the season. Draft Top was the title sponsor of the 250 lap race. Dead On Tools will be the title sponsor of the race in 2021. 

2021 & 2022: Race extended due to NASCAR overtime.

Multiple winners (drivers)

Multiple winners (teams)

Manufacturer wins

References

External links

NASCAR Xfinity Series races
 
Recurring sporting events established in 1970
Annual sporting events in the United States
1970 establishments in Tennessee
Former NASCAR races